The 2017–18 season was Football Club Crotone's second season in Serie A after the club's 17th-place finish the previous season, in which the club sat in the relegation zone for most of the campaign. Crotone competed in Serie A and the Coppa Italia. The club finished 18th in the league, being relegated to Serie B after just two seasons in Serie A, and were eliminated in the fourth round of the Coppa Italia.

Players

Squad information
.

Transfers

In

Loans in

Out

Loans out

Pre-season and friendlies

Competitions

Serie A

League table

Results summary

Results by round

Matches

Coppa Italia

Statistics

Appearances and goals

|-
! colspan=14 style=background:#DCDCDC; text-align:center| Goalkeepers

|-
! colspan=14 style=background:#DCDCDC; text-align:center| Defenders

|-
! colspan=14 style=background:#DCDCDC; text-align:center| Midfielders

|-
! colspan=14 style=background:#DCDCDC; text-align:center| Forwards

|-
! colspan=14 style=background:#DCDCDC; text-align:center| Players transferred out during the season

Goalscorers

Last updated: 20 May 2018

Clean sheets

Last updated: 20 May 2018

Disciplinary record

Last updated: 20 May 2018

References

F.C. Crotone seasons
Crotone